Candace Wheeler (née Thurber; March 24, 1827 – August 5, 1923), often credited as the mother of interior design, was one of America's first woman interior and textile designers. She is noted for helping to open the field of interior design to women, supporting craftswomen, and for encouraging a new style of American design. She founded both the Society of Decorative Art in New York City (1877) and the New York Exchange for Women's Work (1878).

Wheeler was associated with the Colonial Revival, Aesthetic Movement, and the Arts and Crafts Movement throughout her long career, Wheeler was considered a national authority on home decoration.  Wheeler is also noted for designing the interior of the Women's Building at the 1893 World's Columbian Exposition in Chicago, IL.

Early life

Candace Wheeler was born Candace Thurber on March 24, 1827 in Delhi, New York west of the Catskill Mountains. Her parents were Abner Gilman Thurber (1797–1860) and Lucy (née Dunham) Thurber (1800–1892).  Candace was the third born of eight siblings: Lydia Ann Thurber (1824-?), Charles Stewart Thurber (1826–1888), Horace Thurber (1828–1899), Lucy Thurber (1834–1893), Millicent Thurber (1837–1838), Abner Dunham Thurber (1839–1899), and Francis Beattie Thurber (1842–1907). 

Wheeler led a happy a childhood, though she expressed annoyance at how their father raised them "a hundred years behind the time" (6, Peck and Irish). Her father was strictly Presbyterian but also a strict abolitionist. He ensured that the family never used any product made by slaves. So concerned was this endeavor of Abner, that the family used homemade maple sugar instead of cane sugar and linen woven from flax they grew on their farm instead of southern cotton. Looking back, Candace was convinced their farm had been a stop on the underground railroad.

Candace attended an "infant school" where at age six she stitched her first sampler.  Around age 11 or 12, Candace began attending Delaware Academy in Delhi.

Career
In 1876, Wheeler visited the Philadelphia Centennial Exposition.  She was deeply impressed by the Royal School of Art Needlework's display.  But it was not the artistry of the needlework that inspired Wheeler.  She was interested in needlework as a woman-run business that benefited women. 

While still in Philadelphia, Wheeler conceived of an American version of the Royal School that would include "all articles of feminine manufacture."  In her opinion, this model could help "educated" but impoverished women.  Years later, in a letter to her niece, Wheeler described herself as "jumping at the possibility of work for the army of helpless women of N.Y. who were ashamed to beg & untrained to work."

Society of Decorative Art in New York
Wheeler founded the Society of Decorative Arts in New York in 1877.  Other founding members included Louis Comfort Tiffany, John LaFarge, and Elizabeth Custer.  The Society was meant to help women support themselves through handicrafts such as needlework, sewing, and other decorative arts.  The Society had a special focus on the thousands of women who were left indigent at the end of the Civil War.  Wheeler called on prominent New York society matrons to support a shop in which the high-quality, custom-made goods could be sold to produce income.  The Society had five hundred subscribers within three years.

Leading artists were hired to teach or judge exhibits at the Society of Decorative Arts in New York.  Wheeler helped to start related societies in Chicago, St. Louis, Hartford, Detroit, Troy, New York and Charleston, South Carolina.

New York Exchange for Women's Work
In 1878, Wheeler helped launch the New York Exchange for Women's Work, where women could sell any product that they could manufacture at home, including baked goods and household linens.  This new enterprise served a broader range of women as no artistic skills were required.  The Exchange opened in March 1878 with a consignment sale of thirty items at the home of Exchange co-founder Mary Choate.  In April, the exchange moved to a rented facility and by May it as successful enough to employ to part-time sales women.  In its first year, the Exchange paid out nearly $14,000 in commissions.  By 1891, there were at least seventy-two Exchanges across the United States.

In 1879, Wheeler resigned from the Society of Decorative Arts.

Tiffany & Wheeler 
In 1879, Candace Wheeler and Louis Comfort Tiffany co-founded the interior-decorating firm of Tiffany & Wheeler.  The firm decorated a number of significant late-19th-century houses and public buildings, including the Veterans’ Room of the Seventh Regiment Armory, the Madison Square Theatre, the Union League Club, the George Kemp house, and the drawing room of the Cornelius Vanderbilt II house. The firm also designed the interior of Mark Twain’s house.

Tiffany & Wheeler as also known as Tiffany & Co., Associated Artists.  The partners were Louis Comfort Tiffany, Candace Wheeler, William Pringle Mitchell, and Lockwood de Forest.

Associated Artists 

In 1883, Wheeler formed her own textile firm, involving by women only, under the name Associated Artists.  The firm produced a wide range of textile goods including tapestries and curtains.   Associated Artists was particularly well-known for its "changeable" silks. Woven out of two threads, these fabrics changed color depending on the light.

Wealthy customers could create custom fabrics.  Andrew Carnegie commissioned a Scotch thistle damask for his own use.  Lillie Langtry ordered a floral silver-grey brocade portiere for her bedroom.

At the same time, Wheeler took care to make sure that her products were available to a wide audience by creating machine-ready patterns and reflecting American designs and local plant forms.  Between 1884 and 1894, Cheney Brothers turned out more than 500 fabrics for Associated Artists that were sold throughout the United States at all levels of the market.

Associated Artists's signature tapestry style was a combination of loom and tapestry weaving that Wheeler had invented.  The technique made the stitches practical invisible and created a visually smoother tapestry.

Onteora 
In 1892, In coordination with her husband and brother, Wheeler founded an artist colony in the Catskill Mountains called Onteora.  The colony was attractive to single women who could show their skills in art or writing to gain finances, it eventually owned two thousand acres of land.

Chicago World's Columbian Exposition 
In 1893, at the age of 66, Wheeler was asked to serve as the interior decorator of the Woman's Building at the Chicago World's Fair, and to organize the State of New York's applied arts exhibition there.  The Woman's Building was overseen by Bertha Palmer and designed by architect Sophia Hayden.  Artists featured in the Woman's Building included Alice Rideout, Marie Herndl, Mary Cassatt, and Wheeler's daughter Dora Wheeler Keith.   The building was filled with exhibitions of women's fine arts, crafts, industrial products and regional and ethnic specialties from around the world.

Panels lined the grand rotunda of the Woman's Building listing ''golden names of women who in past and present centuries have done honor to the human race,'' a roll-call echoed in the names on the floor of Judy Chicago's 1979 ''The Dinner Party.''

Later life
Wheeler spent much of her later life writing books and articles on decorating and the textile arts, as well as fiction. She published her last book in 1921.

Personal life
On a trip to New York City in 1843, Candace met Thomas Mason Wheeler (1818-1895).  Within a year, they married.  Eventually, the couple had four children:

 Candace Thurber Wheeler (1845–1876), who married Lewis Atterbury Stimson (1844–1917), and was the mother of Henry L. Stimson, who became the U.S. Secretary of State
 James Cooper Wheeler (1849–1912), who married Annie Morris Robinson on October 4, 1878.
 Dora Wheeler (1856–1940), who married Boudinot Keith (1859–1925)
 Dunham Wheeler (1861–1938) who married Anne Quartley.

Wheeler died on August 5, 1923 at the age of 96.

Publications
Household Art. New York: Harper & Brothers, (1893).
Content in a Garden. New York: Houghton Mifflin and Company, (1901).
How to make rugs. New York: Doubleday, Page & Company, (1902).
Principles of Home Decoration. New York: Doubleday, Page & Company, (1903).
The Annals of Onteora: 1887–1914. New York: E.W. Whitfield, (1914?)
Yesterdays in a busy life. New York: Harper & Brothers, (1918).
The Development of Embroidery in America. New York: Harper & Brothers, (1921).

References
Notes

Sources

 Peck, Amelia. “Candace Wheeler (1827–1923).” In Heilbrunn Timeline of Art History. New York: The Metropolitan Museum of Art, 2000–. (October 2004)

External links

Candace Wheeler: The Art and Enterprise of American Design, 1875-1900, a full text exhibition catalog from The Metropolitan Museum of Art  

Candace Wheeler: The Mother of American Interior Design.
Candace Wheeler, designer and reformer.
Metropolitan Museum of Art: Candace Wheeler (1827–1923).
Burrows Studio: Associated Artists Collection. Candace Wheeler Fabric and Wallpaper Designs.

1827 births
1923 deaths
American designers
19th-century American women artists
20th-century American women artists
American women interior designers